The High Bridge is a railroad bridge crossing the Kentucky River Palisades, that rises approximately 275 feet from the river below and connects Jessamine and Mercer counties in Kentucky. Formally dedicated in 1879, it is the first cantilever bridge constructed in the United States. It has a three-span continuous under-deck truss used by Norfolk Southern Railway to carry trains between Lexington and Danville. It has been designated as a National Historic Civil Engineering Landmark.

History
In 1851, the Lexington & Danville Railroad, with Julius Adams as chief engineer, retained John A. Roebling to build a railroad suspension bridge across the Kentucky River for a line connecting Lexington and Danville, Kentucky west of the intersection of the Dix and Kentucky rivers.  In 1855, the company ran out of money and the project was resumed by Cincinnati Southern Railroad in 1873 following a proposal by C. Shaler Smith for a cantilever design using stone towers designed by John A. Roebling (who designed the Brooklyn Bridge).

The bridge was erected using the cantilever design with a three-span continuous under-deck truss, and was opened in 1877 on the Cincinnati Southern Railway. Construction was completed using 3,654,280 pounds of iron at a total cost of $404,373.31. In 1879 President Rutherford B. Hayes and Gen. William Tecumseh Sherman attended the dedication.

Around 1908, Kentucky River High Bridge and the surrounding area was a popular destination for local Kentucky artist Paul Sawyier. Sawyier made many friends living in the area and the landscape was the subject of many of his famous paintings.  In addition to making many friends with local residents, he met the love of his life, Mary Thomas (Mayme) Bull during her travels to the Kentucky River area.  She became the subject of one of his paintings in 1908, ‘Portrait of Mayme Bull in River Landscape’.

After years of heavy railroad use, the bridge was rebuilt by Gustav Lindenthal in 1911.  Lindenthal reinforced the foundations and rebuilt the bridge around the original structure.  To keep railroad traffic flowing, the track deck was raised by 30 feet during construction and a temporary trestle was constructed.  In 1929, an additional set of tracks was built to accommodate increased railroad traffic and the original limestone towers were removed.

The bridge is still accessible by Kentucky State Route 29.  In 2005 state and county officials jointly reopened a nearby park which had been closed since the mid-1960s.  This included a restored open-air dance pavilion, first used in the 19th century; as well as a new playground, picnic area, and viewing platform that overlooks the bridge and river's edge from the top of the palisades.

See also
List of bridges documented by the Historic American Engineering Record in Kentucky
List of bridges in the United States by height

References

External links

High Bridge at Bridges & Tunnels

Bridges completed in 1877
Buildings and structures in Jessamine County, Kentucky
Buildings and structures in Mercer County, Kentucky
Historic American Engineering Record in Kentucky
Historic Civil Engineering Landmarks
Railroad bridges in Kentucky
Bridges over the Kentucky River
1877 establishments in Kentucky
Norfolk Southern Railway bridges
Continuous truss bridges in the United States
Cantilever bridges in the United States
Transportation in Jessamine County, Kentucky
Transportation in Mercer County, Kentucky